The Quesnel Millionaires were a junior "A" ice hockey team based in Quesnel, British Columbia, Canada. They were members of the Interior Conference of the British Columbia Hockey League (BCHL). They played their home games at Quesnel Twin Arena. The ownership group accepted an offer from the Chiefs Development group to move them to Chilliwack to play in Prospera Centre as of 2011 which was vacated after the Chilliwack Bruins were sold and moved to Victoria, BC.  They are now known as the Chilliwack Chiefs.

History

The Millionaires started out in the Peace Cariboo Junior Hockey League in 1975. The Millionaires are the 1977, 1978, 1979, and 1987 PCJHL Champions. They have also won the 1977, 1978, and 1979 Cyclone Taylor Cup Championships.  In 1978, the Millionaires also won the Western Canada Junior B championship, defeating the North Saskatchewan Junior B Hockey League's Saskatoon Quakers 2-games-to-none. In 1996, the Millionaires moved to the British Columbia Hockey League.

On May 9, 2011, the BCHL approved the sale of the Quesnel Millionaires to the Chiefs Development Group in Chilliwack, BC.  The former Chiefs franchise was renamed the Langley Rivermen in preparation for the Millionaires' return to Chilliwack.

Season-by-season record
Note: GP = Games Played, W = Wins, L = Losses, T = Ties, OTL = Overtime Losses, GF = Goals for, GA = Goals against

* Prince George Spruce Kings receive bye. Quesnel Millionaires disqualified from playoffs over a missed regular season game.

Playoffs
1981 Lost Semi-final
Fort St. John Golden Hawks defeated Quesnel Millionaires 4-games-to-1
1982 DNQ
1983 Lost Semi-final
Quesnel Millionaires defeated Prince George Spruce Kings 3-games-to-1
Williams Lake Mustangs defeated Quesnel Millionaires 3-games-to-none
1984 Lost Semi-final
Prince George Spruce Kings defeated Quesnel Millionaires 4-games-to-1
1985 Did Not Participate
1986 DNQ
1987 Won League, Lost Mowat Cup
Quesnel Millionaires defeated Prince George Spruce Kings 4-games-to-2
Quesnel Millionaires defeated Grande Prairie North Stars 4-games-to-2 PCJHL CHAMPIONS
Richmond Sockeyes defeated Quesnel Millionaires 2-games-to-none
1988 Lost Semi-final
Prince George Spruce Kings defeated Quesnel Millionaires 4-games-to-none
1989 DNQ
1990 Lost Semi-final
Fort St. John Huskies defeated Quesnel Millionaires 4-games-to-none
1991 Disqualified from Playoffs
1992 Lost Quarter-final
Prince George Spruce Kings defeated Quesnel Millionaires 4-games-to-none
1993 Lost Quarter-final
Williams Lake Mustangs defeated Quesnel Millionaires 4-games-to-none
1994 DNQ
1995 DNQ
1996 Lost Semi-final
Quesnel Millionaires defeated Grande Prairie Storm 4-games-to-2
Prince George Spruce Kings defeated Quesnel Millionaires 4-games-to-1

NHL alumni

Awards and trophies

Joe Tennant Memorial Trophy
Barry Wolff: 1998

Bob Fenton Trophy
Trevor Hertz: 2010
Jamie Molendyk: 2002

Bruce Allison Memorial Trophy
Gilbert Brule: 2003

See also
List of ice hockey teams in British Columbia

External links
 Official website of the Quesnel Millionaires
 Official website of the BCHL

Defunct British Columbia Hockey League teams
Ice hockey teams in British Columbia
1975 establishments in British Columbia
Ice hockey clubs established in 1975
Ice hockey clubs disestablished in 2011
2011 disestablishments in British Columbia